The Spa is a sitcom created, written and starring Derren Litten broadcast by Sky Living. It is set in a health spa in Hertfordshire and follows the daily goings-on of the business. The first series consisted of seven episodes and aired between February and March 2013. A New Year Special concluded the series on 27 December 2013.

Background
The Spa follows the daily running of a health club where a run in with the staff can be deadly.  The spa is run by bossy manageress Alison Crabbe, who is confident she can turn the spa into a successful business, despite a series of unfortunate accidents and terrible customer service.  Alison is joined by an eccentric and inept group of employees who find themselves in strange and bizarre situations as a matter of routine.

Main characters
Rebecca Front as Alison 
Derren Litten as Marcus 
Tim Healy as Eric
Debbie Chazen as Davina
Niky Wardley as Sally
Nadine Marshall as Vron
Vilma Hollingbery as Rose 
Chris Geere as Bolek
Ramin Karimloo as Costas 
Cheryl Fergison as Bergita Wylde
Frances Barber as Ginny

Episodes

DVD release
The complete first seven episodes of the series was released onto DVD on 25 March 2013.

References

External links
 The Spa Official Website

2010s British sitcoms
2013 British television series debuts
2013 British television series endings
English-language television shows
Sky Living original programming
Sky sitcoms
Television series by Banijay
Television series by Tiger Aspect Productions